Garrick Tremain (born 1941) is a New Zealand cartoonist and painter living in Queenstown.

Biography
He has been a professional painter since 1972 and a cartoonist since 1988. Tremain has produced a cartoon six or seven days a week for various New Zealand newspapers, including the Otago Daily Times, apart from a few months of semi-retirement from February 2007, when he produced weekly cartoons.

He has been a finalist for the Qantas Media Awards Cartoonist in 2000 and 2004.

Controversy
On 3 December 2019 the Otago Daily Times published a cartoon by Tremain making light of the measles epidemic in Samoa. At that point the epidemic had killed 53 people, almost exclusively small children. Many people questioned how a cartoonist could think this an appropriate subject for a cartoon, and also why the editor allowed it to be published. Some of Tremain's colleagues at the ODT spoke out against the publication of the cartoon. The Race Race Relations Commissioner Meng Foon called the cartoon a "slap in the face" for the victims' families.

The public response to the cartoon led to an apology by the ODT the same day, in which editor Barry Stewart said "The content and timing of the cartoon were insensitive, and we apologise without reservation for publishing it.”

On 4 December Tremain apologised for his lack of judgment but also referred to the cartoon as a "light-hearted joke" and said he "saw nothing wrong with it". Protestors outside the ODT offices called for Tremain to be fired and Stewart to step down. Stewart told them that Tremain's position with the paper was under review, and he would not be published again until that review was complete.

Tremain had previously been accused of "playing with outdated and bigoted stereotypes". On 23 December, the New Zealand Media Council ruled that Tremain's cartoon was "gratuitously hurtful and discriminatory". The Council had received 130 complaints in response to Tremain's "Samoan measles" cartoon.

Selected bibliography
Nursery Rhymes Mother Never Read You (2005) 
20 years of Garrick Tremain (2008)

References

External links
Garrick Tremain - webpage

1941 births
Living people
New Zealand cartoonists
People from Queenstown, New Zealand
New Zealand people of Cornish descent